Hinton v Donaldson (1773, 5 Brn 508) was a case by which the Court of Session rejected the claim that copyright in Scots law existed beyond the limited term which had been introduced under the Statute of Anne.

The case had been brought by a London bookseller, John Hinton, concerning the reprinting of a work by Thomas Stackhouse on which Hinton claimed rights. The case was brought against the booksellers Alexander Donaldson, John Wood and James Meurose. James Boswell, who was a friend of Donaldson, led for the defenders.

The judges found (with Lord Monboddo dissenting) that an author had no property rights in a book, but only the temporary rights which had been granted under the Statute.

The case influenced the subsequent House of Lords ruling in Donaldson v Beckett (1774).

References 

1773 in Scotland
Court of Session cases
1773 in case law
Copyright law in Europe
Scots civil law